The McLaren M29 is a Formula One racing car built and run by McLaren during the 1979 Formula One World Championship and the 1980 Formula One World Championship. The F version of the McLaren M29 was built in 1979, but only ran during five races of the 1981 Formula One World Championship. The M29F was the last of the M-numbered cars to be raced, as later in the season, the McLaren MP4/1 was readied for use in the championship.

Complete Formula One World Championship results
(key) (results in bold indicate pole position) (results in italics indicate fastest lap)

* 8 points in  scored using the McLaren M28
** 1 point in  scored using the McLaren M30
*** 27 points in  scored using the McLaren MP4/1

McLaren Formula One cars
1979 Formula One season cars
1980 Formula One season cars
1981 Formula One season cars